John Ryder  (born 19 July 1988) is a British professional boxer. He has held the WBO interim super-middleweight title since 2022, having previously held the WBA interim super-middleweight title in 2019. At regional level he has challenged twice for the British middleweight title in 2013 and 2015, and once for the British super-middleweight title in 2017.

Amateur career
As an amateur, Ryder fought for Angel Amateur Boxing Club in his birthplace of Islington, winning 30 fights out of 35.

Professional career
Ryder turned professional on 10 September 2010, scoring a first-round technical knockout (TKO) against Ben Deghani. Having won his first fifteen fights, Ryder faced fellow undefeated prospect Billy Joe Saunders for his British and Commonwealth middleweight titles on 21 September 2013, losing a close unanimous decision (UD) with scores of 115–113, 115–113 and 115–114 for Saunders. Ryder won his first regional championship—the vacant WBO Inter-Continental middleweight title—on 11 October 2014, defeating Theophilus Tetteh via fifth-round TKO. He defended this title once, against Billi Facundo Godoy with a tenth-round TKO.

After Saunders vacated the British middleweight title, a bout was held between top contenders Ryder and Nick Blackwell on 30 May 2015. Ryder was widely ahead on the scorecards when he was stopped on his feet by Blackwell in the seventh round. Ryder bounced back on 30 January 2016, winning his second regional championship—the vacant WBA International middleweight title—with a UD over Sergey Khomitsky.

Ryder defended his WBA International middleweight title against Jack Arnfield on 24 September 2016, losing by UD over twelve rounds. 

Ryder rebounded in his next fight, defeating Adam Etches by UD to win the IBF International super-middleweight title. 

On 22 April 2017, Ryder moved up to super-middleweight to face Rocky Fielding for the British title but lost on a controversial split decision (SD). 

On 5 May, 2018, Ryder faced domestic rival Jamie Cox at The O2 Arena on the undercard of the rematch between David Haye and Tony Bellew. In a fight that had a grueling start, both fighters were trading punches from close range early. This led to Ryder dropping Cox in the second round. Cox would not be able to beat the referee's count, although by a tiny margin, earning Ryder the KO victory.

In his next fight, Ryder faced undefeated Russian challenger Andrey Sirotkin. Sirotkin gave Ryder problems early in the fight with his jab. By the time the fight came to the sixth round, Ryder looked like he was gaining control of the fight, hurting Sirotkin with a body shot. The punishment continued in the seventh round, culminating in a right hook to Sirotkin's body, from which the Russian would not recover. Ryder was awarded the KO win in the seventh round.

On the Canelo Álvarez vs. Daniel Jacobs card in Las Vegas in May 2019, Ryder beat Bilal Akkawy by TKO in the third round to win the vacant WBA interim super-middleweight title and put himself in line to challenge Callum Smith for the WBA (Super) and Ring magazine super-middleweight titles. 

Following the successful defeat of Akkawy, Ryder fought Callum Smith for the super-middleweight titles in November 2019, losing via UD. Ryder managed to keep Smith on the inside for the beginning rounds. In the third round, Smith was able to impose his will, setting up for right hands with his long job. Ryder managed to get Smith to fight on the inside again in the fifth round. As the fight went on, frequent clinching slowed the pace down. In the last rounds, Smith looked like he was tired, while Ryder was being the aggressor. Smith managed to land a couple of right hands before the final bell, as Ryder was still charging forward. The judges scored the fight 117–111 and 116–112 twice in favour of Smith, with some media outlets describing the scores as "controversial".

Professional boxing record

References

External links

John Ryder profile at Matchroom Boxing
John Ryder - Profile, News Archive & Current Rankings at Box.Live

1988 births
Living people
Middleweight boxers
English male boxers
People from Islington (district)
Boxers from Greater London
Super-middleweight boxers